Charles V. Park (January 19, 1885 – September 11, 1982) was a noted librarian. The Charles V. Park Library at Central Michigan University is named after him. He was born in Hill City, Kansas. His parents were Abraham and Lovina Park. He married Frances Odenheimer on September 1, 1917 in Los Angeles, California. They had a son and daughter together, James "Ted" and Mrs. Ray (Persis) Rynberg .

Park graduated with an A.B. degree from Stanford University in 1909. He received a library certificate from the New York Public Library in 1915. He was an assistant librarian at Stanford University from 1910 to 1930. He was the Director of the Central Michigan University library from 1930 until his retirement in 1957. The library at Central Michigan University was named after him in 1968. He died in 1982 at the age of 97 .

In his memoir “A Country Boy’s Road to College”. Park writes “J.E. Goodwin, Assistant Librarian in charge of services to the public decided to try to find two or three students who would be interested in working full time in the library – seven hours per day – while they carried a part-time schedule of graduate work” (1959, p. 46). This proposal from J.E. Goodwin at Stanford came to Park during his senior year of studies in economics at the institution. As can be assumed, Park accepted the position to further fund his graduate work – originally more economics. Two years later, Park's economics professor, while accepting a new position at Cornell, offered Park the opportunity to study for his Ph.D. as his assistant. At the same time, Park was offered the assistant librarian position at Stanford as the aforementioned J.E. Goodwin resigned his position. (Park, 1959). As can be assumed, Park accepted the position at Stanford, where he remained for 15 years.

In 1931 Park accepted a new position as the head of libraries at ‘Central State Teacher’s College’ now known as Central Michigan University. In his first year there, the school's newsletter reported his improvements to the library, which included moving the service desk away from quiet reading areas and purchasing several volumes at reduced cost and great value to the small-budgeted library. (Smith, 1932) Later, when asked why he chose to move from Stanford (with a larger budget) to Central Michigan, Park (quoting Caesar) stated “I’d rather be first in a Siberian village than second in Rome” (Swenson, 1965). After Park's retirement, Swenson, speaking to Mt Pleasant's community through the local newspaper, says “Working with a practically non-existent budget, Park laid the ground-work early to “enlarge and enrich the book collection, assemble a professional staff, establish a library science department and build a new building” (1965). At times, the article states book purchasing was ceased entirely, particularly through the depression times. Park's economics experience seems to provide him with excellent management skills in the library, both in depression years and later as he led construction of a new building. In the same local news article, Swanson speaks of Park's decision to use a ‘modular’ building because it was inexpensive and allowed for simpler additions. It is unclear when the original Park library was constructed, as Swansons article implies the building was already constructed at its publication in 1965, but a webpage of Central Michigan University's (Phillips, 2001)claims the original Park Library was opened in 1968. Regardless, the existing library at Central Michigan University is named after Park, and has indeed underwent additions, the most recent of which occurred in 2002 and was utilized in the research for this paper.

Another of Park's goals for the CMU library was to begin a department to instruct future college librarians. It is noted in Swanson's article that he “taught a course to prospective public school librarians’, and that he began an LIS program at CMU. Outside of the university library, there are records of Park's activity serving in the professional organization of College and Research librarians, particularly as they involve the education of new librarians. He was secretary of the organization during the years 1944-1945, and published in their journal in June 1945 in an edition of the journal devoted to the education of librarians. Park's contribution, entitled “Degrees as They Affect Teachers’ College Librarians” asks for the professional librarian to be on par with the professional teacher/professor – in pay scale and in required amount of coursework to get there. As is common today, most academic libraries required a 2-year masters program for employment. However, Park's request for similar educational requirements for professors and librarians is provoked in that the professors of the time were only required one year of master's level work to begin teaching. Unlike today's standards, Park suggested rectifying the matter by requiring only one year of master's level library coursework. At times he encouraged prospective librarians to obtain the one-year masters in a different field while taking library classes as well, to enable them to get a degree and be quickly employable while still having some preparation and employability in a library setting.

References
Who's Who in Library Service, 3rd Edition, 1955.
Obituary from the Mount Pleasant (Michigan) Morning Sun, September 12, 1982.
Park, C. V. (1945). Degrees as they affect teachers’ college librarians. College and research libraries, v. 6, 274-276.
Park, C. V. (1959). A country boy's road to college. Mount Pleasant, MI: C. V. Park's personal notes.
Phillips, M. W., & Hendershot, R. M. (2001). Charles Park library. Retrieved from http://clarke.cmich.edu/cmubuildings/park.htm
Smith, M. C. (1932). Central State's library grows in size and service. Centralight, pp. 4.
Swenson, C. (1965). Library has title, Park has library. Daily Times News, pp. 1A, 2A.

1885 births
1982 deaths
People from Graham County, Kansas
Stanford University alumni
Stanford University staff
American librarians
Central Michigan University faculty